Raggie is a 2020 Estonian-Danish computer-animated fantasy film directed by Meelis Arulepp and Karsten Kiilerich, based on the 1962 children's book of the same name by Estonian children's author Eno Raud.

Premise 
When six-year-old Ruby's older brother Mark has to return to school after the summer holidays end, she befriends a magical doll which comes to life.

Voice cast

Estonian voice cast 
Ott Sepp as Sipsik
Jan Uuspõld as Rat Boy
Merle Palmiste as Moon and woman in taxi
Nikolai Bentsler as Taxi driver
Ago Anderson as Father
Hilje Murel as Mother
Helene Vannari as Grandmother
Piret Krumm as Kristel Adrienne
Elo-Mirt Oja as Anu
Eliise Mööl as Kaara
Tobias Turk as Mattias
Hugo Malmsten as Mart

Danish voice cast 
Jesper Asholt as Pjalte
Ella Daisy Anthony-Collins as Ida
Louis Næss-Schmidt as Mark
Rebecca Rønde Kiilerich as Mor, Rottemor and Måne
Tom Jensen as Far and Rottedreng
Vigga Bro as Bedste
Siff Ahrens as Mellanie, Vicky and Christel
Malik Hansen Addington as Mathias
Mia Lerdam as Fugl, Rottepige and woman in taxi
Peter Zhelder as Taxachauffør and Rottefar

Production
TBA

Reception
TBA

Release 
Raggie was released in Estonian cinemas on 19 February 2020, and made €481,402 from 107,496 admissions, making it the third highest-grossing film in Estonia of 2020.

References

External links 

2020 films
2020 animated films
Estonian animated films
Estonian-language films
Danish animated films
2020s Danish-language films
Films based on works by Estonian writers
Films directed by Karsten Kiilerich
2020 multilingual films
Estonian multilingual films
Danish multilingual films